Savaari is a 2018 Indian Malayalam-language comedy film written and directed by Ashok Nair. The film stars Suraj Venjaramoodu, Sunil Sukhada. It was produced under the banner of Opened Eyes CreationsRoyal Vision.

Plot 
The story begins with a man fondly known as Savaari (Suraj Venjaramoodu) waking up at dawn to start his day of menial work in Thrissur on his old rusty bicycle. On the first day of Thrissur Pooram he fails to reach on time for the sample firecracker show as he was sent out of the city by one of the organizers of the Thrissur Pooram to buy watermelons. The second day of the Pooram his bicycle, that he is very attached to, is stolen so he goes around asking people he works for/ knows for help and but no one helps. While he is waiting outside the police station, a local thief asks the inspector why Savaari is sad. After knowing that he is the cause for the sorrow of Savaari, he returns the bicycle. Savaari continues his day as usual. An organisation for Autistic children has raised enough funds for a school and has invited its contributors and actor Dileep for the inauguration ceremony during which people present are made aware of the contributions of Savaari for the betterment of the children.

Cast
 Suraj Venjaramoodu as Savari
 Dileep as himself (Special Appearance)
 Sunil Sukhada as Job
 Jayaraj Varier as Venu Menon
Harisanth as Ashokan
Chembil Ashokan as Varghese
Shivaji Guruvayoor as Unni Menon
Rajeev as Rajeev
Praveena as Nirmala Teacher
Nandakishor Nellickal as Gopi
V. K. Baiju as Police Inspector

Release
Savaari was released on 20 July 2018 (India).

References

External links
 

2010s Malayalam-language films
Indian comedy films
2018 comedy films
Films shot in Thrissur